The cruiser baseline (CGBL) was a design study for a ship that has the combat capabilities of VLS-capable  (CG-52 onwards) while designing the hull to DDG-51 standards and technology. The resulting design was considerably larger than the Ticonderoga-class design, owing to increased margins and allowances for weight and mission growth.

See also

Notes

Ship types
Abandoned military projects of the United States
Cancelled ships of the United States Navy
Cold War cruisers of the United States